This is a list of Protestant missionary societies in China (1807–1953).

Protestant missionary societies in China 1807–1953

See also
Historical Bibliography of the China Inland Mission
List of Protestant missionaries in China
List of Christian Missionaries
Timeline of Christian missions
Chefoo School

Notes

References

Further reading
 R. G. Tiedemann. Reference Guide to Christian Missionary Societies in China: From the Sixteenth to the Twentieth Century (2009).

Christian missionary societies
Christian missions in China
Qing dynasty
19th century in China
Protestant missionaries in China
19th-century Protestantism